Australasia is a region that comprises Australia, New Zealand and some neighbouring islands in the Pacific Ocean. The term is used in a number of different contexts, including geopolitically, physiogeographically, philologically, and ecologically, where the term covers several slightly different, but related regions.

Derivation and definitions

Charles de Brosses coined the term (as French Australasie) in Histoire des navigations aux terres australes (1756). He derived it from the Latin for "south of Asia" and differentiated the area from Polynesia (to the east) and the southeast Pacific (Magellanica).

In the late 19th century, the term Australasia was used in reference to the "Australasian colonies". In this sense it related specifically to the British colonies south of Asia: New South Wales, Queensland, South Australia, Tasmania, Western Australia, Victoria (i.e., the Australian colonies) and New Zealand. Australasia found continued geopolitical attention in the early 20th century. Historian Hansong Li finds that against the backdrop of British colonialism, German geopoliticians considered "Australasia" as a counterweight to the former German South Sea Edge (Südseerand), both of which form the "Indo-Pacific" region. 

The New Zealand Oxford Dictionary gives two meanings of "Australasia". One, especially in Australian use, is "Australia, New Zealand, New Guinea, and the neighbouring islands of the Pacific". The other, especially in New Zealand use, is just Australia and New Zealand.

Two Merriam-Webster dictionaries online (Collegiate and Unabridged) define Australasia as "Australia, New Zealand, and Melanesia". The American Heritage Dictionary online recognizes two senses in use: one more precise, being similar to the aforementioned senses, and the other broader, loosely covering all of Oceania.

See also 

 Asia-Pacific
 Australasia at the Olympics
 Austral-Asia Cup
 Down Under
 Sundaland
 Trans-Tasman
 Zealandia

Notes

References

External links